Tunja is a city on the Eastern Ranges of the Colombian Andes, in the region known as the Altiplano Cundiboyacense, 130 km northeast of Bogotá. In 2018 it had a population of 172,548 inhabitants. It is the capital of Boyacá department and the Central Boyacá Province. Tunja is an important educational centre of well-known universities. In the time before the Spanish conquest of the Muisca, there was an indigenous settlement,  called Hunza, seat of the hoa Eucaneme, conquered by the Spanish conquistadors on August 20, 1537. The Spanish city was founded by captain Gonzalo Suárez Rendón on August 6, 1539, exactly one year after the capital Santafé de Bogotá. The city hosts the most remaining Muisca architecture: Hunzahúa Well, Goranchacha Temple and Cojines del Zaque.

Tunja is a tourist destination, especially for religious colonial architecture, with the Casa Fundador Gonzalo Suárez Rendón as oldest remnant. In addition to its religious and historical sites it is host to several internationally known festivals and is a jumping-off point for regional tourist destinations such as Villa de Leyva, Paipa, and Sierra Nevada del Cocuy. It is a stop on the Pan American Highway which connects Tunja to Bogotá and Santa Marta and eventually to the northern and southernmost parts of South America.

Demographics and geography 
Tunja has a population of 172,548 inhabitants according to the 2018 Census. 0.1% of the city is indigenous, 0.4% is black, and 99.5% is white and Mestizo.

Climate 
Tunja's climate is influenced by its location and altitude. At almost 3000 m it is one of the higher cities in Colombia. As a result, the city features a subtropical highland climate (Köppen Cfb) with little variation in temperature throughout the year but a distinct dry season from December to February.

History

Pre-Columbian era 

The earliest evidence of human population on the Altiplano Cundiboyacense has been dated to approximately 12.000 years ago. Homus Tequendama inhabited the area by 6375 BCE. Archeologists have found human skeletons including arm bones in the area. Many archaeological discoveries were found in the area of the present-day city, dated to approximately 150 BCE.

During the 1st millennium AD, the territory was inhabited by the Muisca, who spoke Chibcha and emigrated from Central America through Panama to the Andean Region. The Muisca developed their own religion, calendar and mythology.

According to those myths, it was the brutal cacique and prophet Goranchacha who moved the capital for the northern Muisca from Ramiriquí to Tunja, then called Hunza.

Early Muisca 

An era when frequent battles among cacicazgos took place, peace was proposed for the region and an agreement was made among caciques to choose a supreme chief to rule them all. Hunzahúa, who came from Ramiriqui, was elected. The capital of his confederation was named Hunza. Hunzahúa took the title of hoa ("great lord", the same meaning as psihipqua who ruled from Muyquytá), and reign over the lands from the Chicamocha to Fusagasugá and from the Llanos de San Juan to Panche and Muzo frontiers, including Vélez territory. This helped to unify the Muisca, especially with respect to their language and religion, until zipa Saguamanchica broke this unity due to differences with the cacique of Guatavita.

Late Muisca (1490–1539) 

Saguamanchica, with 50,000 soldiers, decided on a massive attack on hoa Michuá, crossing Guatavita and Chocontá, after which the Battle of Chocontá is named. Michuá dealt with him, supported by an army which doubled Saguamanchica, battling around three hours and killing both chiefs. A new hoa, Eucaneme, was installed, during the tense truce between Bacatá and Hunza.

In 1514, Eucaneme found out about the expansionist intentions of the new psihipqua Nemequene. He asked the caciques of Gámeza, Sugamuxi, Tundama and Sáchica to help him to reinforce his army. A battle was fought in Ventaquemada and, when Nemequene was about to become the victor, he was fatally wounded and his troops retreated. Iraca retracted his support and Eucaneme got a truce whose terms would end when the Spanish arrived. When Eucaneme found out the Europeans were around his lands, he decided to stay in Hunza and avoided any aggression against the invaders. He forbade under strict penalties to show the conquistadors the path to his headquarters and when he knew they were reaching him, he sent them gifts and peacemakers, hoping to stop them while he was hiding his treasures.

Hunza in Muisca history

Spanish colony (1539-1811)

Spanish Discovering of Hunza (1537)
Gonzalo Jiménez de Quesada parted from Santa Marta in April 1536, on the first main expedition into the Andes. His main goal was to find and conquer El Dorado. After months of traveling, he found many Muisca cacicazgos in the Altiplano Cundiboyacense. In his search, he acquired information about emerald discoveries and other treasures in Somondoco and the Llanos. On August 20, 1537, the conquerors arrived, with horses and dogs. Jiménez de Quesada arrived at the headquarters of Quemuenchatocha, finding him in a chair, dressed in gold in the same way as his companions who ran off, leaving him alone. The gold, the emeralds and the fancy fabrics were taken. This conquest took place where later the San Agustin Convent was built. Quemuenchatocha was taken to Suesca, with the hope he would reveal where he hid the rest of his treasure. He abdicated in favour of his nephew Aquiminzaque and retired to Ramiriquí where he died.

Invasion of Hunza (1538-1539)
The Spanish Invasion of the territory begins when Jimenez de Quesada captures Quemuenchatocha who is succeeded in life by the young Aquiminzaque. The latter, along with his tribe were taken as an encomienda by Hernán Pérez de Quesada. The new zaque did not show belligerent in front of the Spaniards, and later himself converted to Catholicism. The continuous and numerous exigencies made by Spaniards started to discomfort among the Muisca population.

Aquiminzaque should verify his nuptials with the daughter of the cacique of Gameza and many chiefs decided to go the solemn ceremony. A rumour came to Perez de Quesada that the occasion would be used as an insurrection, for which he apprehended Aquiminzaque and all the caciques, among them the ones from Toca, Motavita, Samacá, Turmequé and Sutamarchán, and condemn them to death. In 1540, the Zaque was beheaded and his death marked the end of the dynasty of zaques of Hunza. In the same way, it points to the disintegration and dispersion of natives in encomiendas along the new Tunja Province.

City Foundation (1539-16th Century)
The Spanish city of Tunja was founded on the lands of Quemuenchatocha, where later the convent of San Agustin was built. Founded by Captain Gonzalo Suarez Rendón, on August 6, 1539, the main square was established, also a yard for the church and public buildings around the square; in 1550, the city outlines were consolidated. The same year, The franciscans arrive to the city, and the Dominicans a year later, the Augustinians in 1585 and the Jesuits in 1611; To the foundation, 77 yards are added and divided, along with 70 vegetable gardens, 11 estates and 44 stables. Only until 1616 two parishes are built to receive mestizos and Indians during colonial period: Santa Barbara, at southwest and Las Nieves, at north.

Security and living conditions 
Tunja has the lowest homicide rate in Colombia and is below average in Latin America according to the report from the International Centre of the Prevention of Crime for 2010.  2 homicides per 100,000 inhabitants in 2015 makes the city one of the safest in the Americas. According to other sources, this value is four times lower than the national average. Tunja is an example of a safe city.

Tourism

Relevant historical and tourist sites 
The streets are named according to 472 and Google Maps nomenclatures — (C: calle), (K: carrera), (S: aouth), (E: east), (A: ave).
 
Southern Sector

Eastern Sector

Downtown

Northern Sector

Festivals 
 International Festival of Culture
 Holy Week (Semana Santa)
 Aguinaldo Boyacense

Shopping

Downtown 
Main places of interest are:
El Cid
El Virrey
Teatro Boyacá
Cinema Boyacá

Shopping malls 
Unicentro is a shopping center that features a Jumbo and a Cinemark Theatres among many other stores.

Viva, a brand of Shopping Centers of Grupo Éxito.

Traditional markets 
 Plaza de Mercado del Norte
 Plaza de Mercado del Sur

Education 
Relative to its small size, Tunja has been important in providing education. A large part of its population are students between high school and university.

Tunja has a considerable number of colleges, among these is the College of Boyacá, the first public school in the territories of Venezuela, Ecuador, Panama and Colombia, established when these countries were part of Gran Colombia. It was founded on 20 October 1822 by Vice President Francisco de Paula Santander. Among the most important schools are:
 Colegio de Boyacá
 Institucion Educativa San Jeronimo Emiliani
 Colegio Salesiano Maldonado
 Colegio INEM Carlos Arturo Torres
 Colegio de la Presentación
 Gimnasio Campestre del Norte.
 Colegio Municipal Silvino Rodríguez
 Escuela Normal Superior Santiago de Tunja.
 Escuela Normal Femenina "Leonor Álvarez Pinzón"
 Colegio Los Angeles
 Colegio Militar Juan José Rondón
 Colegio de Nuestra Señora del Rosario
 Colegio Gustavo Rojas Pinilla
 Colegio Andino
 Colegio American School Saint Frances
 Country Bilingual School

Universities 
Tunja's major university, the Pedagogical and Technological University of Colombia (Uptc), was founded by General Gustavo Rojas Pinilla, and is one of the public universities in Colombia.

Other universities are:
 University of Boyaca
 Universidad Santo Tomás
 Escuela Superior de Administración Pública E.S.A.P.
 Universidad Nacional Abierta y a Distancia (UNAD)
 Fundacion Universitaria Juan de Castellanos
 Corporación Universitaria Remington (CUR-Cread Boyacá)
 Universidad Antonio Nariño
 Universidad Pontificia Bolivariana de Colombia
 Instituto Universitario de la Música y las Artes

Sports 
The city has two professional football teams: Boyacá Chico and Patriotas F.C. The teams play in the Colombian Professional Football A league. They play their games at La Independencia Stadium in the north of the city.

The stadium was rebuilt for the Copa Libertadores 2009, expanding capacity to 20,630 spectators and meeting FIFA specifications.
The city organized the 2008 South American U-20 Futsal Cup in which Brazil was awarded as the championship. Colombia secured the fourth position in the tournament.

The city has a professional basketball team called Patriotas that plays in the Saludcoop Invitational Cup. This team plays its matches in the Municipality Colosseum that has a capacity of up to 5,000 spectators.

Born in Tunja  
 Jair Bernal, former professional cyclist
 Iván Casas, professional cyclist
 Francisca Josefa de la Concepción, Criollo nun
 Pedro Antonio Herrera, professional cyclist
 José Ibáñez, former professional cyclist
 Diego Molano Vega, politician
 Gustavo Nieto Roa, film director
 Juan Carlos Pinzón, ambassador of Colombia to the United States
 Gustavo Rojas Pinilla, former president of Colombia
 Diego de Torres y Moyachoque, 16th century mestizo cacique of Turmequé

Sister cities 
 : São Paulo
 : Guayaquil
 : Jyväskylä
 : Dublin
 : Catania
 : Potenza (2009)
 : Tapachula
 : Juliaca
 : Cádiz
 : Málaga (2013)
 : Sevilla
 : Toledo (2013)
 : Pamplona (2012)
 : Popayán (2012)
 : San Juan de Pasto
 : Valledupar

References

External links

  News from Tunja at Excelsio
  News from Tunja at Mi Tunja.net

 
Municipalities of Boyacá Department
Populated places established in 1539
Capitals of Colombian departments
1539 establishments in the Spanish Empire